The State University of Northern Rio de Janeiro (UENF) is a public university located in the city of Campos dos Goytacazes in the State of Rio de Janeiro. The university was  planned by anthropologist Professor Darcy Ribeiro. The university was designed mainly by the renowned architecture Oscar Niemeyer. It was established on February 27, 1991.

References

External links
Official website in Portuguese

Educational institutions established in 1991
Norte Fluminense
Universities and colleges in Rio de Janeiro (state)
Rio de Janeiro